Petukhov is a surname. It may refer to:

Aleksandr Petukhov (Russian footballer, born 1980) (born 1980), Russian professional football player
Aleksandr Petukhov (Kazakhstani footballer) (born 1985), Kazakh professional footballer
Alexei Petukhov (born 1983), Russian cross country skier who has competed since 2002
Denis Petukhov (born 1978), Russian-American ice dancer
Stanislav Petukhov (born 1937), retired ice hockey player who played in the Soviet Hockey League
Yuri Aleksandrovich Petukhov (born 1960), Belarusian professional football coach and a former player
Yuri Dmitrievich Petukhov (1951–2009), Russian writer and pseudo-scientist

See also
Petkov
Petkovy
Petukhovo
Petukhovsky (disambiguation)

Russian-language surnames